GRIK4 (glutamate receptor, ionotropic, kainate 4) is a kainate receptor subtype belonging to the family of ligand-gated ion channels which is encoded by the  gene.

Function
This gene encodes a protein that belongs to the glutamate-gated ionic channel family. Glutamate functions as the major excitatory neurotransmitter in the central nervous system through activation of ligand-gated ion channels and G protein-coupled membrane receptors. The protein encoded by this gene forms functional heteromeric kainate-preferring ionic channels with the subunits encoded by related gene family members.

Clinical significance

A single nucleotide polymorphism (rs1954787) in the GRIK4 gene has shown a treatment-response-association with antidepressant treatment.

Variation in GRIK4 have been associated with both increased and decreased risk of bipolar disorder. A possible mechanism for this observation is that the sequence variation influences secondary structures in the 3' UTR.

Interfering with GRIK4/KA1 function with a specific anti-KA1 antibody protects against kainate-induced neuronal cell death.

A test of that gene can be made in order to know if a depressed patient will respond to the SSRI citalopram.

Evolutionary significance 
The GRIK4 gene displayed significantly higher rates of evolution in primates than in rodents and especially in the lineage leading from primates to humans.  Furthermore, the GRIK4 gene is implicated in the development of the nervous system.  Hence evolution of the GRIK4 gene is thought to have played a role in the dramatic increases in size and complexity of the brain that occurred during evolutionary history leading to humans.

References

External links 
 
 

Ionotropic glutamate receptors
Biology of bipolar disorder